The 1969 NCAA Skiing Championships were contested at Mount Werner ski area near Steamboat Springs, Colorado at the 16th annual NCAA-sanctioned ski tournament to determine the individual and team national champions of men's collegiate alpine skiing, cross-country skiing, and ski jumping in the United States.

Denver, coached by Willy Schaeffler, captured their twelfth national championship and eighth in nine years (the Pioneers' previous streak of seven consecutive titles was interrupted by Wyoming in 1968). Denver finished 16.6 points ahead of runners-up Dartmouth in the team standings.

The sole repeat champion was Clark Matis of Colorado in cross country.

Venue

This year's championships were held March 27–29 in Colorado at Mount Werner ski area in Steamboat Springs, with the jumping event at Howelsen Hill. The previous year's championships were held at the same sites.

The sixteenth edition, these were the fifth in Colorado, and the second at Steamboat Springs. Winter Park hosted the state's first two (1956, 1959), followed by Crested Butte in 1966. 

Mount Werner was sold later this year and rebranded as "Steamboat" in 1970.

Team scoring

Individual events

Four events were held, which yielded seven individual titles.
Thursday: Slalom 
Friday: Downhill, Cross Country
Saturday: Jumping

See also
List of NCAA skiing programs

References

NCAA Skiing Championships
NCAA Skiing Championships
NCAA Skiing Championships
NCAA Skiing Championships
NCAA Skiing Championships
NCAA Skiing Championships
NCAA Skiing Championships
Skiing in Colorado